The Central Cordilleran languages are a group of closely related languages within the Northern Luzon subgroup of the Austronesian language family. They are spoken in the interior highlands of Northern Luzon in the Cordillera Central mountain range.

Classification 
Reid (1974) classifies the Central Cordilleran languages as follows:
Isinai
North Central Cordilleran
Kalinga–Itneg
Itneg (a dialect cluster)
Kalinga (a dialect cluster)
Nuclear Cordilleran
Ifugao
Balangao
Bontok–Kankanay
Bontok–Finallig
Kankanaey

Reid (1991) has suggested that the Central Cordilleran languages are most closely related to the Southern Cordilleran languages, which is supported by numerous exclusively shared innovations listed by Himes (2005).

Reconstruction 

Proto-Central Cordilleran has been reconstructed by Reid (1974; 2006).

Phonology 

Proto-Central Cordilleran can be reconstructed with phonemic stress.

Vocabulary 
The comparison table (taken from Reid (1974) illustrates the correspondences between the Central Cordilleran languages, including inherited vocabulary as well as Central Cordilleran innovations.

References

External links 
"Central Cordilleran" at Ethnologue, 23rd ed., 2020

Northern Luzon languages
South–Central Cordilleran languages